Club Deportivo Basket Zaragoza, a.k.a. Mann Filter Zaragoza for sponsorship reasons, was a Spanish women's basketball club from Zaragoza that played in the LFB. It was founded in 2000 from newly promoted CN Helios, which had previously replaced 1990 Copa de la Reina champion Banco Zaragozano.

Zaragoza has made it into the LFB's top four in 2002, 2003, 2010 and 2011, playing the championship play-offs in five occasions. In 2005 it reached the Copa de la Reina's final, lost to CB Avenida, and it has played the Eurocup in 2004, 2010 and 2011. Most recently Zaragoza was 5th in the 2011-12 LFB.

2011–12 Roster
 (1.96)  Jacinta Monroe
 (1.93)  Romana Vynuchalová
 (1.92)  Jaklin Zlatanova
 (1.89)  María Pina
 (1.87)  Arhonda Covington
 (1.85)  Katerina Sotiriou
 (1.81)  Revuelto Sánchez
 (1.77)  Queralt Casas
 (1.77)  Estela Royo
 (1.76)  Blanca Marcos
 (1.70)  Cristina Ouviña

Season by season

References

Women's basketball teams in Spain
Basketball teams established in 2000
Basketball teams disestablished in 2013
Sport in Zaragoza
Basketball teams in Aragon